F1 2002 is a racing video game published by Electronic Arts and released for Xbox, Microsoft Windows, PlayStation 2, GameCube and Game Boy Advance. The game was based on the 2002 season.

Strangely, Hockenheimring and Nürburgring both still use their original layouts, and BMW Williams F1 Team use Compaq logos before being bought by HP. This was rectified in the Microsoft Windows and Game Boy Advance versions.

Reception
GameSpot named F1 2002 a runner-up for its June 2002 "PC Game of the Month" award. It was also a runner-up for GameSpots annual "Best Driving Game on PC" and "Best Driving Game on GameCube" awards, losing to Rally Trophy and NASCAR: Dirt to Daytona, respectively.

References

External links
 
 

2002 video games
Electronic Arts games
EA Sports games
Formula One video games
Game Boy Advance games
GameCube games
PlayStation 2 games
Racing video games
Video games developed in the United Kingdom
Windows games
Xbox games
F1 (video game series)